The Mercedes-Benz W165 is a racing car designed by Mercedes-Benz to meet voiturette racing regulations. It won its only race, the 1939 Tripoli Grand Prix, driven to a 1–2 victory by Hermann Lang and teammate Rudolf Caracciola.

This car was remarkably designed and built in eight months for this prestigious and very fast north African event, which was the time that the rules were changed by the Italian organizers; this was done as an attempt to avoid another dominant victory by German manufacturers Mercedes-Benz and Auto Union and to give Italian manufacturers Alfa Romeo and Maserati a chance at victory. The car had a 1.5L supercharged V8 engine; it would have been eligible for the post war Grand Prix period from 1946 to 1951, but it never raced during that time, whereas the Alfa Romeo 158, one of the W165's competitors during the 1939 Tripoli Grand Prix was very much the dominant car during that time. The bigger and more powerful W154 was Mercedes's main Grand Prix car during 1938 and 1939, so the W165 was only used once; there was hardly any other use for it.

Following an invitation by Indianapolis Motor Speedway owner Tony Hulman, Caracciola entered a W165  in the 1946 Indianapolis 500. However, Swiss customs refused to allow the car out of their country, preventing Caracciola from competing.

Complete results

Non-championship results

References

Notes

Bibliography

External links

W165